This is a list of diplomatic missions in Saint Kitts and Nevis.  At present, the capital city of Basseterre hosts 3 embassies.  Several other countries have honorary consuls to provide emergency services to their citizens.

Embassies in Basseterre

Non-Resident Embassies/High Commissions

 (Port-of-Spain)
 (Caracas)
 (Kingston)
 (Bogotá)
 (Havana)
 (Washington, DC)
 (Kingston)
 (Santo Domingo)
 (Bridgetown)
 (Washington, DC)
 (St. John's)
 (Havana)
 (Washington, DC)
 (Bridgetown)
 (Santo Domingo)
 (Port-of-Spain)
 (Ottawa)
 (Roseau)
 (Havana)
 (Washington, DC)
 (Caracas)
 (Castries)
 (Port-of-Spain)
 (Caracas)
 (Port-of-Spain)
 (Santo Domingo)
 (Bogotá)
 (Georgetown)
 (New York City)
 (Washington, DC)
 (Santo Domingo)
 (Santo Domingo)
 (Washington, DC)
 (Port-of-Spain)
 (Panama City)
 (Havana)
 (Havana)
 (Havana)
 (Havana)
 (Havana)
 (Washington, DC)
 (Washington, DC)
 (Washington, DC)
 (Havana)
 (Washington, DC)
 (New York City)
 (Washington, DC)
 (New York City)
 (Caracas)
 (Havana)
 (Castries)
 (New York City)
 (Havana)
 (Santo Domingo)
 (Port-of-Spain)
 (Washington, DC)
 (Washington, DC)
 (Havana)
 (Havana)
 (Washington, DC)
 (Bogota)
 (Santo Domingo)
 (Santo Domingo)
 (Santo Domingo)
 (Kingston)
 (Havana)
 (New York City)
 (Havana)
 (Kingston)
 (Santo Domingo)
 (Kingston)
 (Washington, DC)
 (Stockholm)
 (Santo Domingo)
 (Washington, DC)
 (Washington, DC)
 (Washington, DC)
 (Washington, DC)
 (Washington, DC)
 (Ottawa)
 (Washington, DC)
 (Washington, DC)
 (Washington, DC)
 (Washington, DC)
 (Santo Domingo)
 (Havana)
 (Bogota)
 (Washington, DC)
 (Bridgetown)
 (Bridgetown)
 (Havana)
 (Havana)
 (Havana)
 (Ottawa)
 (Washington, DC)

Former Embassy

References

Ministry of Foreign Affairs: Foreign Embassies in Saint Kitts and Nevis – Official Page

Foreign relations of Saint Kitts and Nevis
Saint Kitts and Nevis
Diplomatic missions
Diplomatic missions